MV Stephanie Marie is a passenger ferry owned and operated by Aleson Shipping Lines. She's the former MV Marima III and currently acquired by Aleson Shipping since 1998.

MV Stephanie Marie is also dubbed as MV Stephanie Marie 1 following the acquisition of MV Stephanie Marie 2

References 

1979 ships
Ships built in Japan
Ferries of the Philippines
Ships of the Philippines